Georgetown University School of Nursing is one of the eleven schools of Georgetown University. Founded in 1903 as the School of Nursing, it added three other health related majors in 1999 and appended its name to become the School of Nursing & Health Studies. In 2022, the school returned to the name School of Nursing, as the School of Health was divided from it. The school has been at the forefront of education in the health care field, offering many programs unique to America's elite institutions.  Offering undergraduate and graduate programs in the health sciences, graduates are prepared to enter the complex fields of medicine, law, health policy, and nursing. The School of Nursing is made up of the Department of Health Systems Administration, the Department of Human Science, the Department of International Health, and the Department of Nursing.

The Department of Human Science completed the Discovery Center in 2006. The Discovery Center includes a Basic Health Science Teaching Laboratory, a Molecular and Cell Biology Research Laboratory, a Cell Culture Room, a Preparation and Instrument Room, and a Zeiss Axiovert 200 microscope.

In 2011, the Department of Nursing launched an online nursing initiative at the graduate level.  The online initiative builds upon Georgetown's on-campus graduate nursing program and is the university's first-ever online degree-granting program.

The School of Nursing is home to GUS - Georgetown University Simulator - a full-body, robotic mannequin that can realistically replicate physiological conditions and symptoms and pharmacological responses.  The simulator is within the O'Neill Family Foundation Clinical Simulation Center, which includes adult patient simulators, a pediatric patient simulator, five primary care offices, and two hospital units.  The Simulation Center is used extensively for clinical education by undergraduate and graduate level nursing programs, as well as by undergraduates in the Department of Human Science.

Several graduate programs within the School of Nursing were ranked in the 2012 "America's Best Graduate Schools" edition of U.S. News & World Report. The Nurse Anesthesia Program was ranked 17th, the Healthcare Management Program was ranked 29th, the Nurse Midwifery Program was ranked 19th, and the nursing graduate program was ranked 36th. The school also has an active research program.

Degrees Offered

Bachelor of Science
Health Care Management & Policy
Human Science
International Health
Nursing
Graduates of these programs have pursued careers and/or graduate study in the following areas: medicine, physician assistant, advanced practice registered nursing, dentistry, podiatry, physical therapy, clinical research, public health, epidemiology, forensics, pharmaceutical sales/marketing, health care law, health care consulting, hospital administration, and many other fields. Certificates are also available for undergraduate students in the following subject areas: International Health and Population Health.

Master of Science
MS in Global Health
MS in Health Systems Administration
MS in Nursing
AG-ACNP
Family Nurse Practitioner
Clinical Nurse Leader
Nurse Educator
Nurse-Midwifery/Women's Health Nurse Practitioner
Women's Health Nurse Practitioner

Doctoral
Doctor of Nursing Practice
Doctor of Nurse Anesthesia

Online Nursing and Health Studies Programs 
Georgetown University School of Nursing offers an online Master of Science degree in Nursing with four specializations. The online courses operate in a seminar style, and clinical components can be completed at locations in or near students’ home communities. Georgetown's nursing programs are accredited by the Commission on Collegiate Nursing Education.

Online FNP Program 
The online FNP program follows the same curriculum as the on-campus program. The curriculum covers topics such as disease prevention, health promotion, and management of acute and chronic illness. During the OCIs, students can use a simulator at the O’Neill Family Foundation Clinical Simulation Center located within the NHS. This simulator helps students practice in a safe, supervised environment by replicating physiological conditions and symptoms as well as pharmacological responses. Graduates of the program are eligible to sit for the Family Nurse Practitioner certification exam offered by the American Nurses Credentialing Center.

Online Midwifery Program 
Georgetown University's Nurse-Midwifery/Women's Health Nurse Practitioner program was started in 1972 and transitioned to online classes in 2011. Students come to the Georgetown University campus three times during the program for hands-on experience with professors, and log more than a thousand hours of clinical experience in or near their own communities while working with a preceptor. Classes prepare students to manage obstetrical and gynecological needs for women, manage the care of a healthy newborn, and provide primary care to women. Graduates can sit for the Certified Nurse Midwives exam offered by the American Midwifery Certification Board and the Women's Health Nurse Practitioner exam offered by the National Certification Corporation.

List of deans

References

Citations

Sources

Further reading 

 

Georgetown University Medical Center
Georgetown University schools
Educational institutions established in 1903
Nursing schools in Washington, D.C.
Jesuit universities and colleges in the United States
1903 establishments in Washington, D.C.